Lai, also known as Láiyí, was an ancient Dongyi state located in what is now eastern Shandong Province, recorded in the Book of Xia.  Tang Shanchun believes lái means "mountain" in the ancient Yue language (古越语), while the Yue Jue Shu says lai means "wilderness".

History
Lai was a traditional enemy of the State of Qi to its west.  As soon as Jiang Ziya, the first ruler of Qi, was enfeoffed at Qi, the state of Lai attacked its capital at Yingqiu.  In 567 BC, Lai attacked Qi but was decisively defeated by Duke Ling of Qi, and its last ruler Furou, Duke Gong of Lai, was killed.  Lai was a large state, and Qi more than doubled in size after annexing Lai. The people were moved to Laiwu, where Mencius later called them the Qídōng yěrén, the "savages of eastern Qi".

Rulers of Lai
Furou, Duke Gong of Lai ?–567 BC

References

Ancient Chinese states
History of Shandong
Zhou dynasty